Patricia Noriko Miranda (born June 11, 1979 in Manteca, California) is a former American collegiate wrestler. She is the first American woman in Olympic history to receive a medal in woman's Olympic wrestling, winning the bronze at the 2004 Summer Olympics in the 48 kg or 106 lb weight class.

As the daughter of political refugees from Brazil, Miranda began her wrestling career at age eleven by becoming the first female to wrestle at Redwood Middle School and Saratoga High School. Her father initially opposed her wrestling and once threatened to sue her high school for allowing his daughter to wrestle on the boys' team. He eventually allowed her to wrestle as long as she maintained a 4.0 grade point average.

She continued wrestling at Stanford University and eventually earned a spot on the all-male NCAA Division 1 roster as a 125-pound starter. During her senior year, Miranda became only the second woman in NCAA history to beat a male opponent in competition and the first in more than a decade to do so at the time. In female competition, Miranda has had strong success including two World Championship silver medals and an Olympic bronze medal.

Miranda earned a bachelor's degree in Economics and a Master’s in International Policy Studies from Stanford University. In 2005, she won a highly competitive The Paul & Daisy Soros Fellowships for New Americans to help support her graduate studies in law.  In 2007, she received her Juris Doctor from Yale Law School.  Her coach and husband, Levi Weikel-Magden, is also a law school graduate, earning his degree at the University of Virginia. She is currently a partner at Miranda, Magden & Miranda LLP.

Career highlights
Olympic Games
Bronze Medal – Freestyle – 48 kg 2004 – Athens, Greece
World Championships
Bronze Medal – Freestyle – 51 kg 2006 – China
Silver Medal – Freestyle – 48 kg 2003 – New York, NY, United States
Silver Medal – Freestyle – 51 kg 2000 – Sofia, Bulgaria
World Cup Championships
Gold Medal – Freestyle – 51 kg 2007 – Krasnoyarsk, Russia
Gold Medal – Freestyle – 51 kg 2003
(Named Most Outstanding Wrestler, 2003)
Pan American Games
Gold Medal – Freestyle – 48 kg 2003 – Santa Domingo, Dominican Republic

References

External links
 Patricia's Miranda's U.S. Olympic Team bio

1979 births
Living people
American female sport wrestlers
Wrestlers at the 2003 Pan American Games
Wrestlers at the 2004 Summer Olympics
People from Manteca, California
Stanford Cardinal wrestlers
World Wrestling Championships medalists
Medalists at the 2004 Summer Olympics
Pan American Games gold medalists for the United States
Olympic bronze medalists for the United States in wrestling
Pan American Games medalists in wrestling
Medalists at the 2003 Pan American Games
21st-century American women